Department of Key West, was a military department of the Union Army created in February 1862 from the Department of Florida.  It had command over the posts that were newly captured by “Expeditionary Corps” combined of Army and Navy units under Brigadier General Thomas W. Sherman and Flag Officer Samuel Francis Du Pont.  These were posts at Fernandina, St. Augustine and the forces investing Fort Pulaski and blockading the Savannah River on Tybee Island at the mouth of the river.

This department was merged into the Department of the South on March 15, 1862, before the capture of Fort Pulaski on April 11, 1862.

Commander
 Brigadier General J. M. Brannan, February 21, 1862, to March 15, 1862.

Posts of the Department of Key West
 Fernandina, Florida  March 3, 1862 - March 15, 1862
 Fort Clinch 
 St. Augustine, Florida March 11, 1862 - March 15, 1862
 Fort Marion March 11, 1862 - March 15, 1862
 Tybee Island, Georgia near Fort Pulaski Nov. 1861 - March 15, 1862

Notes

References
 Eicher, John H., & Eicher, David J., Civil War High Commands, Stanford University Press, 2001, .
  National Archives, Guide to Federal Records; Records of United States Army Continental Commands, 1821-1920 (Record Group 393), 1817-1940 (bulk 1817-1920)
  Archaeological Reconnaissance at the Drudi Tract, Tybee Island, Chatham County, Georgia. LAMAR Institute Publication Series, #127, By Daniel T. Elliott., Savannah, Georgia, 2008

Key West
1862 establishments in the United States